Star Wars Jedi: Survivor is an upcoming action-adventure game developed by Respawn Entertainment and published by Electronic Arts. A sequel to Star Wars Jedi: Fallen Order (2019), it is scheduled to release on PlayStation 5, Windows, and Xbox Series X/S on April 28, 2023.

Gameplay 
Star Wars Jedi: Survivor maintains many of the gameplay elements from its predecessor with new gameplay elements added. In the lightsaber combat, there are five "fully realized" stances in the game that Cal Kestis can use according to game director Stig Asmussen. The single blade and double blade lightsaber stances return from Fallen Order while the special dual-wield single blade attack from Fallen Order is expanded into its own fully playable lightsaber stance. A brand new, heavier Kylo Ren-style crossguard lightsaber stance is added that requires more confidence to use due to its longer timing windows in blocking and parrying enemy attacks. These different stances are designed to be used to combat specific types of enemies which Asmussen says will make the player "figure out what the best weapon of choice is". A new Force stasis ability, like the one used by Kylo Ren in The Force Awakens, allows the player to freeze enemies and blaster bolts in mid-air.

Story 
Picking up five years after the events of Star Wars Jedi: Fallen Order, the story of Star Wars Jedi: Survivor centers on  Jedi Knight Cal Kestis' struggle to stay one step ahead of the hostile Galactic Empire and its relentless efforts to exterminate the last remaining survivors of Order 66. Among his newest adversaries is a mysterious Pau'an Imperial senator, who makes a dangerous deal of sorts, and the Gen'Dai Rayvis, who believes that the Jedi should be extinct.

Development 
The development of a sequel to Jedi: Fallen Order was announced in January 2022. The game's title of Star Wars Jedi: Survivor was announced in May 2022 alongside the debut of a CGI teaser trailer at Star Wars Celebration. The game is being developed by Respawn Entertainment and is scheduled to be released April 28, 2023 for PlayStation 5, Windows, and Xbox Series X/S.

Stig Asmussen claimed real-time ray tracing and other next-gen capabilities enable Respawn to operate "at a quality that's much above anything that we've ever developed before." By exclusively targeting ninth-generation consoles, Survivor will enjoy significantly faster load times with a development team that is no longer obligated to support the older PlayStation 4 and Xbox One consoles the first game launched on. This is due to the PlayStation 5 and Xbox Series X/S consoles featuring a solid state drive (SSD) that enables much faster asset loading times compared to a hard drive.

Marketing and release 
The first cinematic teaser for Star Wars Jedi: Survivor was released in May 2022. EA showed expanded gameplay for the game at The Game Awards on December 8, while also announcing that it would be released on March 17, 2023. On January 31, 2023, EA announced via Twitter that the game's release would be delayed to April 28, 2023, for the Respawn development team to carry out final "bug fixes to enhance performance, stability, polish, and most importantly, the player experience". A nine minute gameplay video was released by IGN on February 7.

There are 3 cosmetic sets available with a pre-order of the game. The first, available with a pre-order of both the standard and deluxe editions, is a "Hermit" cosmetic set replicating Obi Wan Kenobi's outfit from the Obi-Wan Kenobi series and Kenobi's lightsaber from Episodes I and II. The two exclusive "Scoundrel" and "Rebel Hero" cosmetic sets available with the deluxe edition replicate Han Solo's DL-44 blaster and scoundrel outfit and Luke Skywalker's yellow jacket outfit from A New Hope.

Tie-in media 
Star Wars Jedi: Battle Scars is a tie-in novel written by Sam Maggs, was released on March 7, 2023, which bridges the five year story gap between Fallen Order and Survivor. The book's cover was revealed on December 1, 2022, featuring returning characters from Fallen Order including Cere Junda, Greez Dritus, Nightsister Merrin and BD-1. The Inquistor Fifth Brother, who appeared in the TV series Star Wars Rebels and Obi-Wan Kenobi, was confirmed to appear. A preview excerpt from the book was released on January 31, 2023 where Cal Kestis must infilitrate the secret headquarters of the Haxion Brood crime syndicate that featured in Fallen Order.

References

External links 

Action-adventure games
Electronic Arts games
PlayStation 5 games
Respawn Entertainment games
Single-player video games
Space opera video games
Star Wars video games
Upcoming video games scheduled for 2023
Video games developed in the United States
Windows games
Xbox Series X and Series S games